Racing Romance is a 1926 American silent action film directed by Harry Joe Brown and starring Reed Howes, Virginia Brown Faire and Harry Northrup.

Cast
 Reed Howes as Howard Billings 
 Virginia Brown Faire as Isabel Channing 
 Harry Northrup as Mr. Channing 
 Mathilde Brundage as Mrs. Channing 
 Victor Potel as Constable 
 Ethan Laidlaw as Thornhill 
 William Barrymore as Henchman

References

Bibliography
 Munden, Kenneth White. The American Film Institute Catalog of Motion Pictures Produced in the United States, Part 1. University of California Press, 1997.

External links

1926 films
1920s action films
American horse racing films
American action films
Films directed by Harry Joe Brown
American silent feature films
Rayart Pictures films
American black-and-white films
1920s English-language films
1920s American films